Paolo Di Stefano (born 1956) is an Italian novelist and journalist.

Life and career 
Born in Avola, Di Stefano graduated in Romance studies at the University of Pavia and then started working as a journalist and a columnist for various publications, including Corriere della Sera, La Repubblica and Corriere del Ticino. He debuted as a novelist in 1994, and won several awards including the Viareggio Prize in 2013 for Giallo d'Avola and the Bagutta Prize in 2016 for Ogni altra vita. In 2008 he was a finalist of the Premio Campiello for the novel Nel cuore che ti cerca. He is also an author of essays, short stories and collections of poems.

References

External links 
 Paolo Di Stefano at Goodreads

1956 births
Living people
People from Avola
University of Pavia alumni
20th-century Italian novelists
21st-century Italian novelists
20th-century Italian journalists
21st-century Italian journalists
Viareggio Prize winners